{{DISPLAYTITLE:C25H36O6}}
The molecular formula C25H36O6 (molar mass: 432.54 g/mol, exact mass: 432.251189 u) may refer to:

 Hydrocortisone 17-butyrate
 Hydrocortisone 21-butyrate
 Pseudopterosin A

Molecular formulas